Bruto Castellani (1 December 1881– 1933) was an Italian film actor of the silent era. Castellani appeared in more than thirty films during his career, including Antony and Cleopatra (1913).

Selected filmography
 Antony and Cleopatra (1913)
 Quo Vadis (1913)
 Julius Caesar (1914)
 Marco Visconti (1925)
 The Beautiful Corsair (1928)

References

Bibliography 
 Hatchuel, Sarah & Vienne-Guerrin, Nathalie. Shakespeare on Screen: The Roman Plays. Publication Univ Rouen Havre, 2009.

External links 
 

1880s births
1933 deaths
Italian male film actors
Italian male silent film actors
Male actors from Rome
20th-century Italian male actors